A humid subtropical climate is a zone of climate characterized by hot and humid summers, and cool to mild winters. These climates normally lie on the southeast side of all continents (except Antarctica), generally between latitudes 25° and 40° and are located poleward from adjacent tropical climates. It is also known as warm temperate climate in some climate classifications.

Under the Köppen climate classification, Cfa and Cwa climates are either described as humid subtropical climates or warm temperate climates. However, while some climatologists have opted to describe this climate type as a "humid subtropical climate", Köppen himself never used this term. The humid subtropical climate classification was officially created under the Trewartha climate classification. In this classification, climates are termed humid subtropical when they have at least 8 months with a mean temperature above .

While many subtropical climates tend to be located at or near coastal locations, in some cases, they extend inland, most notably in China and the United States, where they exhibit more pronounced seasonal variations and sharper contrasts between summer and winter, as part of a gradient between the hotter tropical climates of the southern coasts and the colder continental climates to the north and further inland. As such, the climate can be said to exhibit somewhat different features depending on whether it is found inland, or in a maritime position.

Characteristics

In a humid subtropical climate, summers are typically long, hot and humid. A deep current of tropical air dominates the humid subtropics at the time of high sun, and daily intense (but brief) convective thundershowers are common. Summer high temperatures are typically in the high 20s to mid-30s °C (80s or 90s °F), while overnight lows in the summer are typically in the lower 20s °C (70s °F). Monthly mean temperatures in winter are often mild, typically averaging .

Rainfall often shows a summer peak especially where monsoons are well developed, as in Southeast Asia and South Asia. Other areas have a more uniform or varying rainfall cycles but consistently lack any predictably dry summer months unlike mediterranean climates. Most summer rainfall occurs during thunderstorms that build up due to the intense surface heating and strong subtropical sun angle. Weak tropical lows that move in from adjacent warm tropical oceans, as well as infrequent tropical storms often contribute to summer seasonal rainfall peaks. Winter rainfall is often associated with large storms in the westerlies that have fronts that reach down into subtropical latitudes.

In the Holdridge classification, the humid subtropical climates coincide more or less with the warmest Cfa and Cwa climates and the less warm humid tropical "Köppen" climates (Aw, Am and Af).

Breakdown of letters 
Cfa: C = Mild temperate    f = Fully humid     a = Hot Summer

Cwa: C = Mild temperate   w = Dry Winter    a = Hot Summer

Locations

Africa

In Africa, humid subtropical climates are primarily found in the southern part of the continent. The Cwa climate is found over a large portion of the interior of the Middle and Eastern African regions. This area includes central Angola, northeastern Zimbabwe, the Niassa, Manica and Tete provinces of Mozambique, the southern Congo provinces, southwest Tanzania, and the majority of Malawi, and Zambia. Some lower portions of the Ethiopian Highlands also have this climate.

The climate is also found in the narrow coastal sections of southern and eastern South Africa, primarily in KwaZulu-Natal and the Eastern Cape provinces. South Africa's version of this climate features heavy oceanic influences resulting in generally milder temperatures. This is particularly evident in its winters when temperatures do not drop as low as in many other regions within the humid subtropical category.

Asia

East Asia

In East Asia, this climate type is found in the southeastern quarter of mainland China from Hong Kong north to Nanjing, the northern half of Taiwan, north through southern and central Japan (Kyushu, Shikoku and half of Honshu), and the most southern regions of Korea (the south coast and Jeju island). Cities near the equatorward boundary of this zone include Hong Kong and Taipei; while Tokyo, Busan and Qingdao are near the northern boundary.

The influence of the strong Siberian anticyclone in East Asia brings colder winter temperatures than in the humid subtropical zones in North America, South America, and Australia. The  isotherm reaches as far south as the valleys of the Yellow and Wei rivers, roughly latitude 34° N. At Hainan Island and in Taiwan, the climate transitions from subtropical into tropical. In most of this region, the winter monsoon is very well developed, as such eastern Asian humid subtropical zones have a strong winter dry season and heavy summer rainfall.

Only in inland areas below the Yangtze River and coastal areas between approximately the Huai River and the beginning of the coast of Guangdong is there sufficient winter rainfall to produce a Cfa climate; even in these areas, rainfall and streamflow display a highly pronounced summer peak, unlike other regions of this climate type. Drought can be severe and often catastrophic to agriculture in the Cwa zone.

The only area where winter precipitation equals or even exceeds the summer rain is around the San'in region at the western coast of Japan, which during winter is on the windward side of the westerlies. The winter precipitation in these regions is usually produced by low-pressure systems off the east coast that develop in the onshore flow from the Siberian high. Summer rainfall comes from the East Asian Monsoon and from frequent typhoons.

Southeast Asia 
In Southeast Asia, about 90% of the region has a tropical climate; but humid subtropical climates can also be seen here, such as in Northern Vietnam (including Hanoi).

Southeast Asian locations with these climates can feature cool temperatures, with lows reaching  during the months of December, January, and February. Unlike a good portion of East Asian locations with this climate however, most of Southeast Asia seldom experiences snowfall. These areas tend to feature hot and humid summers and cool and wet winters, with mean temperatures varying between 25 to 30 °C (77 to 86 °F) in summer.

South Asia

Humid subtropical climates can also be found in South Asia. However, the humid subtropical climates exhibited here typically differ markedly from those in East Asia (and for that matter a good portion of the globe). Winters here are typically mild, dry and relatively short. They also tend to be foggy. Summers tend to be long and very hot, starting from mid-April and peaking in May and early June with high temperatures often exceeding . They also tend to be extremely dry, complete with dust storms, traits usually associated with arid or semi-arid climates. During this period many native trees defoliate to save water. This is followed by the cooler monsoons, where the region experiences heavy rains on almost a daily basis. Average high temperatures decrease during the monsoon season, but humidity increases. This results in hot and humid conditions, similar to summers in other humid subtropical climates. Cities such as New Delhi, Lucknow, Kanpur and Patna exhibit this atypical version of the climate in India. In Pakistan, the twin cities of Islamabad and Rawalpindi feature this weather pattern. 

In Bangladesh, cities like Rangpur, Saidpur and Dinajpur in northern region features the monsoon variant (Cwa), where rainfall peaks at the monsoon season. Like neighboring Northern Indian plains, this region also shows a distinct three season pattern- relatively dry and very hot summer (March- early june), extremely wet, cooler Monsoon seson (June- September), and mild, foggy winter and autumn (Late October- February)

Humid subtropical climates can also be found in Nepal. However the Nepalese version of the climate generally do not feature the extreme hot spells that are commonplace for many other South Asian locations with this climate. In Nepal cities such as Kathmandu, Pokhara, Butwal, Birgunj and Biratnagar feature this iteration of the climate. 

In South Asia, humid subtropical climates generally border on continental climates as altitude increases, or on winter-rainfall climates in western areas of Pakistan and northwestern India (e.g. Peshawar in northwestern Pakistan or Srinagar in the Kashmir Valley in India, where the primary precipitation peak occurs in March, not July or August). Further east, in highland areas with lengthier monsoons such as Nepal, seasonal temperature variation is lower than in the lowlands.

Western Asia

Although humid subtropical climates in Asia are mostly confined to the southeastern quarter of the continent, there are two narrow areas along the coast of the Caspian Sea and Black Sea with humid subtropical climates. Summers in these locations are cooler than typical humid subtropical climates and  snowfall in winter is relatively common, but is usually of a short duration.

In Western Asia, the climate is prevalent in the Gilan, Māzandarān and Golestan Provinces of Iran, in parts of the Caucasus, in Azerbaijan and in Georgia wedged between the Caspian and Black seas and coastal (Black Sea) Turkey, albeit having more oceanic influence.

Temperatures are generally moderate in comparison with other parts of Western Asia. During winter, the coastal areas can receive snowfall, which is usually of a short duration.

The heavy, evenly distributed rainfall extends north into the Caspian coastal strip of Azerbaijan up to its northern border but this climate in Azerbaijan is, however, a Cfb/Cfa (Oceanic climate/Humid subtropical climate) borderline case.

Western Georgia (Batumi and Kutaisi) in the Kolkheti Lowland and the northeast coast of Turkey (Giresun), have a climate similar to that of Gilan and Mazandaran in Iran and very similar to that of southeastern and northern Azerbaijan. These climates are a Cfb/Cfa (Oceanic climate/Humid subtropical climate) borderline case.

North America

In North America, humid subtropical climates are found in the American Gulf and lower East Coast states, including Texas, Oklahoma, Louisiana, Arkansas, Alabama, Mississippi, Tennessee, North Carolina, South Carolina, Georgia, and Florida. On the Florida peninsula, the humid subtropical climate gives way to the tropical climate of South Florida and the Florida Keys.

Under Köppen's climate classification, this zone includes locations further north, primarily Virginia, Kentucky, the lower elevations of West Virginia, Maryland, Delaware, Washington, D.C., sections of southeastern Pennsylvania, central and southern portions of New Jersey and extreme southeastern New York around New York City and the portions of Long Island. It can also be found in the lower Midwest, primarily in the central and southern portions of Kansas and Missouri, and the far southern portions of Illinois, Indiana and Ohio. 
  
In Mexico, there are small areas of Cfa and Cwa climates. The climate can be found in small areas scattered around the northeastern part of the country, in proximity to the Gulf of Mexico. Other areas where the climate can be found is in the high elevations of Trans-Mexican Volcanic Belt and Sierra Madre Oriental. Despite being located at higher elevations, these locations have summers that are too warm to qualify as a subtropical highland climate. Guadalajara's climate is a major example of this.

Outside of isolated sections of Mexico, the southernmost limits of this climate zone in North America lie just north of South Florida and around southern coastal Texas. Cities at the southernmost limits, such as Tampa and Orlando and along the Texas coast around Corpus Christi down toward Brownsville generally feature warm weather year-round and minimal temperature differences between seasons. In contrast, cities at the northernmost limits of the climate zone such as New York, Philadelphia and Louisville feature hot, humid summers and chilly winters. These areas have average winter temperatures at the coldest limit of climates classed as humid subtropical.

Snowfall varies greatly in this climate zone. In locations at the southern limits of this zone and areas around the Gulf Coast, cities such as Orlando, Tampa, Houston, New Orleans, and Savannah rarely see snowfall, which occurs, at most, a few times per generation. In Southern cities farther north or inland, such as Atlanta, Birmingham, Charlotte, Dallas, Memphis, Nashville, Oklahoma City, and Raleigh, snow only occasionally falls and is usually three inches or less. However, for the majority of the winter here, temperatures remain above or well above freezing. At the northernmost limits of this zone, cities such as New York City, Philadelphia, and Baltimore typically see snowfall during the winter, with occasional heavy snowstorms. Still, average temperatures during a typical winter hover just above freezing at these locations.
Precipitation is plentiful in the humid subtropical climate zone in North America – but with significant variations in terms of wettest/driest months and seasons. Much of the interior South, including Tennessee, Kentucky, and the northern halves of Mississippi and Alabama, tends to have a winter or spring (not summer) precipitation maximum. Closer to the South Atlantic and Gulf coasts, there is a summer maximum, with July or August usually the wettest month – as at Norfolk, Cape Hatteras and Jacksonville, North Carolina, Charleston, South Carolina, Mobile, Alabama and New Orleans. A semblance of a monsoon pattern (dry winters/wet summers) is evident along the Atlantic coast from southern North Carolina (Wilmington, North Carolina area) south to Florida. The seasonal monsoon is much stronger on the Florida peninsula, as most locations in Florida have dry winters and wet summers.

In addition, areas in Texas that are slightly inland from the Gulf of Mexico, such as Austin and San Antonio that border the semi-arid climate zone, generally see a peak of precipitation in May, a drought-like nadir in mid-summer and a secondary, if not equal, precipitation peak in September or October. Areas further south along South Texas' Gulf Coast (Brownsville), which closely border tropical climate classification, typically have a strong September precipitation maximum, and a tendency toward dry conditions in winter with rain increasing in spring, with December or January often the driest months.

South America

Humid subtropical climates are found in a sizable portion of South America. The climate extends over a few states of southern Brazil, including Paraná, into sections of Paraguay, all of Uruguay and central Argentina (Pampas region). Major cities such as São Paulo, Buenos Aires, Porto Alegre and Montevideo, have a humid subtropical climate, generally in the form of hot and humid summers, and mild to cool winters. These areas, which include the Pampas, generally feature a Cfa climate categorization. At 38°S, the Argentine city of Bahía Blanca lies on the southern limit of the humid subtropical zone.

The Cwa climate occurs in parts of tropical highlands of São Paulo state, Mato Grosso do Sul and near the Andean highland in northwestern Argentina. These highland areas feature summer temperatures that are warm enough to fall outside the subtropical highland climate category.

Australia

The humid subtropical climate zone predominantly lies in eastern Australia, which begins from the coastal strip of Mackay, Queensland and stretches down to the southern coast of Sydney, where it transitions into the cooler, oceanic climates.

To note, these places would have characteristics of the semi-arid and/or Mediterranean climates. Furthermore, the inland Cfa climates generally have drier summers, or at least summers with low humidity.

Frost is prevalent in the more inland areas of Sydney, such as Richmond.

There is usually a distinct summer rainfall maximum that becomes more pronounced moving northwards. In Brisbane, the wettest month (February) receives five times the rainfall of the driest month (September).

North of the Cfa climate zone there is a zone centred upon Rockhampton which extends north to the Köppen Cwa classified climate zone of the Atherton Tablelands region. This region has a very pronounced dry winter period, with often negligible rainfall between June and October. Winter temperatures generally only fall slightly below , which would classify the region as a tropical savanna, or Aw, climate.

The most intense 2-3 day rainfall periods that occur in this coastal zone however are the outcome of east coast lows forming to the north of a large high pressure system, there can be great variation in rainfall amounts from year to year as a result of these systems.

Europe

As the continent does not have a large ocean to its east as the case in many other continents within the climate zone, humid subtropical climate in Europe is limited to relatively small areas on the margins of the Mediterranean and Black Sea basins. Cfa zones are generally transitional between the Mediterranean climate zones along the coast and oceanic and humid continental zones to the west and north where rainfall in the warmer months is too high for a Mediterranean classification, while temperatures (either in the summer and/or winter) are too warm to qualify as oceanic or humid continental. Humidity is not as high here as in other continents within this climatic zone.
  
The Po Valley, in Northern Italy, including major cities such as Milan, Turin, Bologna, and Verona, has a humid subtropical climate, featuring hot, humid summers with frequent thunderstorms; winters are foggy, damp and chilly, with sudden bursts of frost. Some parts of the valley have a mild continental climate. Places along the shores of Lake Maggiore, Lake Lugano, Lake Como (Como and Verbania in Italy and Lugano in Switzerland) have a humid subtropical climate with a distinctive high amount of rainfall during summer. Due to recent warming, cities in the Pannonian Basin such as Belgrade, Novi Sad and Budapest, Hungary, are now just warm enough to be categorized as such. At 47°N, Budapest lies on the northern limit of the humid subtropical zone.

The coastal areas in the northern half of the Adriatic Sea also fall within this climate zone. The cities include Trieste, Venice, and Rimini in Italy, Rijeka and Split in Croatia, Koper in Slovenia and Kotor in Montenegro. Other Southern European areas in the Cfa zone include the central valleys and coast of Catalonia of Girona and Barcelona in Spain, some on the north-east of Spain (Huesca), West Macedonia in Greece (Kozani), the Garonne Valley (Toulouse) and Rhone Valley (Valence) in France.

Along the Black Sea coast of Bulgaria (Varna), coast of Romania (Constanta and Mamaia), Sochi, Russia and Crimea, have summers too warm (> in the warmest month) to qualify as oceanic, no freezing month, and enough summer precipitation and sometimes humid conditions, where they would be fit to be classed under Cfa, though they closely border the humid continental zone. All these areas are subject to occasional, in some cases repeated snowfalls and freezes during winter.

In Central Europe, a small area of humid subtropical climates are located in transitional areas between the oceanic and continental climates in areas where higher summer temperature do not quite qualify it for inclusion in the Oceanic climate schema (but, in the Trewartha climate classification, this type of climate is included in that typical of the other areas of central-west Europe, classified as Do -the Temperate Oceanic climate-) and mild winters do not allow their inclusion into continental climates. Average summer temperatures in areas of Europe with this climate are generally not as hot as most other subtropical zones around the world.

In the Azores, some islands have this climate, with very mild and rainy winters (>) and no snowfall, warm summers (>) but with no dry season during the warmest period, which means that they can neither be classified as oceanic, nor as Mediterranean, only as humid subtropical, as with Corvo Island.

In many other climate classification systems outside of the Köppen, most of these locations would not be included in the humid subtropical grouping. The higher summer precipitation and poleward flow of tropical air-masses in summer are not present in Europe as they are in eastern Australia or the southern United States.

See also
Subtropics
Subtropical ridge
List of locations with a subtropical climate

References

Köppen climate types